Anthony Modeste may refer to:

 Anthony Modeste (French footballer)
 Anthony Modeste (Grenadian footballer)